Kühl (often anglicized Kuehl) is a German language surname.

 Alexander Kühl (born 1973), a former German professional basketball player
 Ernst Kühl (1888 – 1972), a Luftwaffe officer during World War II
 Jerry Kuehl (1931-2018), historian and tv producer
 Karl Kuehl (1937 – 2008), an American scout, coach and manager in Major League Baseball
 Kris Kuehl (born 1970), an American discus thrower
 Patrick Kühl (born 1968), a German swimmer
 Ryan Kuehl (born 1972), a National Football League long snapper/defensive tackle
 Sheila Kuehl (born 1941), an American politician and former child actress

See also 
 Kuhl (disambiguation)

